Emma Jones, or Emma Scully jones is  an Australian poet. Her first poetry collection, The Striped World, was published by Faber & Faber in 2009.

Early life and education
Jones was raised in Concord, New South Wales, a suburb of Sydney. Her father is Australian; her British mother had emigrated to Australia.

She studied at MLC School (in Burwood, Sydney), then worked and travelled abroad, returning to Australia to study English at the University of Sydney, where she graduated with the University Medal in 2001.

Jones entered Trinity College, Cambridge in 2002, and received a PhD in English Literature from the University of Cambridge.

Career
Jones was poet-in-residence at the Wordsworth Trust in Grasmere, Cumbria  from 2009 - 2010.

Awards and nominations
2010: New South Wales Premier's Literary Awards: Shortlisted for The Striped World
2010: South Australian Premier's Awards: Shortlisted for The Striped World
2009: Fellowship of Australian Writers First Prize Anne Elder Award for The Striped World
2009: John Llewellyn Rhys Prize: Shortlisted for The Striped World
2009: Forward Poetry Prize: Best First Collection for The Striped World
2009: Queensland Premier's Literary Awards: Arts Queensland Judith Wright Calanthe Award for Best Collection for The Striped World
2005: Newcastle Poetry Prize for poem Zoos for the Dead

References

Australian poets
Living people
Poets from Sydney
1977 births
People educated at MLC School
University of Sydney alumni
Alumni of Trinity College, Cambridge